Killywhan railway station served the hamlet of Killywhan, Dumfries and Galloway, Scotland from 1859 to 1959 on the Castle Douglas and Dumfries Railway.

History 
The station opened on 7 November 1859 by the Glasgow and South Western Railway. To the east was a goods yard and to the west was the signal box which opened in 1878. The station closed to both passengers and goods traffic on 3 August 1959.

References

External links 

Disused railway stations in Dumfries and Galloway
Railway stations in Great Britain opened in 1859
Railway stations in Great Britain closed in 1959
Former Glasgow and South Western Railway stations
1859 establishments in Scotland
1959 disestablishments in Scotland